Celia's Lives is a 2006 Spanish-Mexican drama film directed and written by Antonio Chavarrías which stars Najwa Nimri and Luis Tosar.

Plot 
The night Celia unsuccessfully attempts suicide, a teenage girl (Melany) is raped and murdered nearby. Miguel Ángel, the police officer in charge of finding the perpetrator of the crime, digs around Celia and her closest circle, including her two sisters (Carmen and Ángela) and her husband Agustín. While the cop suspects about the girl's boyfriend (Pedro), Celia suspects about her husband.

Cast

Production 
A Spanish-Mexican co-production, the film was produced by Oberon Cinematográfica, TAU, and Altavista Films, and it had the participation of TVE and TVC.

Release 
The film was presented at the 54th San Sebastián International Film Festival's official selection in September 2006. It was also selected for the Marrakech International Film Festival's main competition. Distributed by Nirvana, it was theatrically released in Spain on 19 January 2007.

Reception 
Jonathan Holland of Variety considered the "cunningly-structured noir" to be Antonio Chavarrías' "finest work to date".

Nuria Vidal of Fotogramas rated the film 3 out of 5 stars, praising "the spaces and the characters", while citing "a certain confusion of times" as a negative point.

Javier Ocaña of El País considered that "with an agile, nervous production and very good performances" (especially by Tosar and Giménez Cacho) the film manages to portray a "desolate" (and perhaps a tad exaggerated) male panorama in relation to their treatment of women.

See also 
 List of Spanish films of 2007

References 

Spanish crime drama films
Mexican crime drama films
2006 crime drama films
2000s Spanish-language films
2000s Mexican films
2000s Spanish films